Qianwei Confucius Temple, or Qianwei Confucian Temple, is a Confucian temple located at No. 297 South Street, Yujin Town, Qianwei County, Leshan City, Sichuan Province.

Qianwei Confucius Temple is the largest Confucian temple in Sichuan, it covers an area of 43,333 square meters.

History
Qianwei Confucius Temple was built during the Xiangfu periods of Emperor Zhenzong of the Northern Song Dynasty (1008-1016), and has been rebuilt three times, relocated three times, and repaired twelve times during the Song, Yuan, Ming, and Qing dynasties and the Republic of China for more than 900 years.

Conservation
In 2006, Qianwei Confucius Temple was listed as the sixth batch of Major Historical and Cultural Site Protected at the National Level in China.

References

Confucian temples in China
Song dynasty architecture
Major National Historical and Cultural Sites in Sichuan
Buildings and structures in Leshan
Tourist attractions in Leshan
Qianwei County